Jean Dell (born 17 March 1961) is a French actor and writer.

Career
After starting out in radio, he turned to the stage, film and television, where he will create and perform several sketches of the show Les Grosses Têtes. He also participated in the show La Classe, where he met his wife, Christiane Bopp.

Theatre

Filmography

Actor

Writer

References

External links

1961 births
Living people
French male film actors
French male television actors
20th-century French male actors
21st-century French male actors
Writers from Saint-Étienne
Actors from Saint-Étienne